Random Acts of Intimacy is the debut album by Scottish rock band, Sucioperro, released on 12 June 2006 by Captains of Industry.

Overview
"The Crushing Of The Little People" was featured on the "Kerrang! New Breed" double album compilation.

Three singles were released from the album -  free 'taster' download "Wolf Carnival"; "Dialog On The 2" and "The Drop" were released on CD and were accompanied by two b-sides each. "Grace & Out Of Me" was later released as a free download to coincide with the band's tour with Surrey rockers Reuben - with the accompanying music video directed by Reuben's Jamie Lenman.

The artwork was the first collaboration between Stewart Chown (who would later go on to become the band's bassist) and Glasgow-based photographer Gordon Burniston.

Track listing
All words and music by Reid, except "Dialog on the 2", words by Reid/Logg.

B-sides
Conversation With A Wasp
The Altruist
Dead Leaf Echo
The Ruins

Videos
Dialog On The 2 - Shot by David Rossi, edited by Ian White
Grace And Out Of Me - Directed by Jamie Lenman

Note: These videos were uploaded to YouTube by Sucioperro.

References

2006 debut albums
Sucioperro albums